The Morita Foundation was conceived and headed by Sony co-founder and chairman until 1994 Akio Morita.

References
Akio Morita gave much to Hawaii, Honolulu Star-Bulletin, October 5, 1999 

Foundations based in Japan